Old Swedish is the name for two distinct stages of the Swedish language that were spoken in the Middle Ages: Early Old Swedish, spoken from about 1225 until about 1375, and Late Old Swedish, spoken from about 1375 until about 1526.

Old Swedish developed from Old East Norse, the eastern dialect of Old Norse. The earliest forms of the Swedish and Danish languages, spoken between the years 800 and 1100, were dialects of Old East Norse and are referred to as Runic Swedish and Runic Danish because at the time all texts were written in the runic alphabet. The differences were only minute, however, and the dialects truly began to diverge around the 12th century, becoming Old Swedish and Old Danish in the 13th century. It is not known when exactly Elfdalian began to diverge from Swedish.

Early Old Swedish was markedly different from modern Swedish in that it had a more complex case structure and had not yet experienced a reduction of the gender system and thus had three genders. Nouns, adjectives, pronouns and certain numerals were inflected in four cases: nominative, genitive, dative and accusative.

Development

Early Old Swedish

It was the first Swedish language document written in the Latin alphabet, and its oldest fragments have been dated to around the year 1225.

Old Swedish was relatively stable during this period. The phonological and grammatical systems inherited from Old Norse were relatively well preserved and did not experience any major changes.

Most of the texts from the Early Old Swedish period were written in Latin, as it was the language of knowledge and the Church. However, Old Swedish was used as a literary language as well, and laws especially were written in it; of the 28 surviving manuscripts from this period, 24 contain law texts. Much of the knowledge of Old Swedish comes from these law texts. In addition to laws, some religious and poetic texts were also written in Old Swedish.

Loanwords

The Catholic Church and its various monastic orders introduced many new Greek and Latin loanwords into Old Swedish. Latin especially had an influence on the written language.

The Middle Low German language also influenced Old Swedish due to the economic and political power of the Hanseatic League during the 13th and 14th centuries. Many German speakers immigrated to Swedish cities and worked in trade and administration. Accordingly, loanwords relating to warfare, trade, crafts and bureaucracy entered the Swedish language directly from Low German, along with some grammatical suffixes and conjunctions. Some of these words still exist in Modern Swedish but are often considered archaic or dialectal; one example is the word  (window). Many words related to seafaring were borrowed from Dutch.

The influence of Low German was so strong that the inflectional system of Old Swedish was largely broken down.

Late Old Swedish

In contrast to the stable Early Old Swedish, Late Old Swedish (1375–1526) experienced many changes, including a simplification of the grammatical system and a vowel shift, so that in the 16th century the language resembled modern Swedish more than before. The printing of the New Testament in Swedish in 1526 marked the starting point for modern Swedish.

In this period Old Swedish had taken in a large amount of new vocabulary primarily from Latin, Low German and Dutch. When the country became part of the Kalmar Union in 1397, many Danish scribes brought Danicisms into the written language.

Orthography

(soul),  in modern Swedish). (without),  in modern Swedish), and  could also sometimes stand for the consonant-vowel combinations  and :  ( or dove).

Phonology

The root syllable length in Old Swedish could be short, long or overlong. Unlike in modern Swedish, a short vowel in Old Swedish did not entail a long consonant.

There were eight vowels in Early Old Swedish: . A vowel shift occurred during the Late Old Swedish period, which had the following effects:

 became  (  > hus , house)
 became  (  > bok , book)
 became  (  > blå , blue)

The Proto-Germanic phoneme  was preserved in initial sounds in Old Swedish (w-) and did survive in rural Swedish dialects in the provinces of Skåne, Halland, Västergötland and south of Bohuslän into the 18th, 19th and 20th centuries. It is still preserved in the Dalecarlian dialects in the province of Dalarna, Sweden. The -phoneme did also occur after consonants (kw-, tw- etc.) in Old Swedish and did so into modern times in said dialects, as well as in the Westro- and North Bothnian tongues in northern Sweden.

Grammar

Nominal morphology

In Early Old Swedish
The most defining difference between Old Swedish and modern Swedish was the more complex grammatical system of the former. In Old Swedish nouns, adjectives, pronouns and certain numerals were inflected in four cases (nominative, genitive, dative and accusative), whereas modern standard Swedish has reduced the case system to a common form and a genitive (some dialects retain distinct dative forms). There were also three grammatical genders (masculine, feminine and neuter), still retained in many dialects today, but now reduced to two in the standard language, where the masculine and feminine have merged. These features of Old Swedish are still found in modern Icelandic and Faroese; the noun declensions are almost identical.

Noun declensions fell under two categories: weak and strong. The weak masculine, feminine and neuter nouns had their own declensions and at least three groups of strong masculine nouns, three groups of strong feminine nouns and one group of strong neuter nouns can be identified. Below is an overview of the noun declension system:

The noun declension system

Vowel stems (strong declension)
a-stems
a-stems
ja-stems
ia-stems
ō-stems
ō-stems
jō-stems
iō-stems
i-stems
u-stems
Consonant n-stems (weak declension)
n-stems
an-stems
ōn, ūn-stems
īn-stems
Consonant stems
 monosyllabic stems
 r-stems
 nd-stems

In Late Old Swedish

By the year 1500 the number of cases in Old Swedish had been reduced from four (nominative, genitive, dative and accusative) to two (nominative and genitive). The dative case, however, lived on in a few dialects well into the 20th century.

Other major changes include the loss of a separate inflectional system for masculine and feminine nouns, pronouns and adjectives in the course of the 15th century, leaving only two genders in the standard Swedish language, although three genders are still common in many of the dialects. The old dative forms of the personal pronouns became the object forms (honom, henne, dem; him, her, them) and -s became more common as the ending for the genitive singular.

Adjectives

Adjectives and certain numerals were inflected according to the gender and case the noun they modified was in. Below is a table of the inflection of weak adjectives.

Verbs

Verbs in Old Swedish were conjugated according to person and number. There were four weak verb conjugations and six groups of strong verbs. The difference between weak and strong verbs is in the way the past tense (preterite) is formed: strong verbs form it with a vowel shift in the root of the verb, while weak verbs form it with a dental suffix (þ, d or t).

Strong verbs

Weak verbs

Weak verbs are grouped into four classes:
Most verbs belong to this class.
Fourth conjugation: these verbs have a more or less irregular conjugation. About twenty verbs belong to this class.

Inside the conjugation classes the weak verbs are also categorised into further three classes:

Syntax
Word order was less restricted in Old Swedish than modern Swedish due to complex verbal morphology. Both referential and nonreferential subjects could be left out as verbal structures already conveyed the necessary information, in much the same way as in languages such as Spanish and Latin.

In nominal phrases the genitive attribute could stand both before and after the word it modified, i.e. one could say his house or house his. The same was true for pronouns and adjectives (that house or house that; green pasture or pasture green). During the Late Old Swedish period the usage of the genitive attribute became increasingly more restricted, and it nearly always came to be placed before the word it modified, so in modern Swedish one would usually only say  (his house), or in some dialects or manners of emphasis, but almost never .

Personal pronouns

Below is a table of the Old Swedish personal pronouns:

Numerals
The Old Swedish cardinal numbers are as follows. Numbers from one to four decline in the nominative, genitive, dative and accusative cases and in all three genders (masculine, feminine and neuter); here the nominative forms are given. Numbers above four are indeclinable.

The higher numbers are as follows. The numbers 21–29, 31–39, and so on are formed in the following way:  (etc.)

Examples

Västgötalagen
This is an extract from the Westrogothic law, which is the oldest continuous text written in the Swedish language, and was compiled during the early 13th century. The text marks the beginning of Old Swedish.

Modern Swedish:

English:

If someone slays a Swede or a Smålander, a man from the kingdom, but not a West Geat, he will pay eight örtugar and thirteen marks, but no wergild. [...] If someone slays a Dane or a Norwegian, he will pay nine marks. If someone slays a foreigner, he shall not be banished and have to flee to his clan. If someone slays a foreign priest, he will pay as much as for a fellow countryman. A priest counts as a free man. If a Southerner is slain or an Englishman, he shall pay four marks to the plaintiff and two marks to the king.

The Life of Saint Eric

This text about Eric IX 

Translation:

Here we want to say with God's grace a few words about that holy God's martyr Saint Eric, who was earlier the King of Sweden. In both heritage and nobility he was fastly of royal extraction as other Swedish leaders. Since the realm was without a leader and he was beloved by all of the land's nobility and all of the common people, the commoners chose him as King with all of their good will, and sat him reverentially on the King's throne at Uppsala.

See also
 Old Norse
 Old Norwegian
 Old Gutnish

Notes

Bibliography
 Bergman, Gösta.Kortfattad svensk språkhistoria. Prisma 1980.
 Kirro, Arto; Himanen, Ritva. Textkurs i fornsvenska. Universitetet 1988.
 Noreen, Adolf. Altschwedische Grammatik. 1904.
 Wessén, Elias. Fornsvenska texter: med förklaringar och ordlista. Läromedelsförlagen, Svenska bokförlagen 1969.

References

External links
 Altschwedische Grammatik by Adolf Noreen at the Germanic Lexicon Project
 Old Swedish verb conjugator

Swedish, Old
Swedish, Old
Swedish
Swedish language
Languages attested from the 13th century
Swedish, Old